The Dubai Sheema Classic is a Group 1 flat horse race in the United Arab Emirates open to thoroughbreds which are four-years-old or above. It is run over a distance of 2,400 metres (approximately  miles; 2410 metres since 2010) on the turf track at Meydan Racecourse, Dubai, and it takes place annually during the Dubai World Cup Night in March.

The race was first run in 1998, and it was initially titled the Dubai Turf Classic. The present name was introduced two years later. The event attained Group 1 status in 2002. Prior to 2010 it was run at Nad Al Sheba Racecourse.

The Dubai Sheema Classic currently offers a purse of US$6 million making it and the Dubai Turf race the two of the most valuable turf races in the world.

Records
Speed  record: (at current distance of 2,410 metres and Meydan Racecourse)
 2:26.97 – Postponed (2016)

Most wins by a jockey:
 4 – William Buick (2010, 2017, 2018, 2019)

Most wins by a trainer:
 3 – John Gosden (2010, 2017, 2021)

Most wins by an owner:
 6 – Godolphin (1998, 2003, 2011, 2017, 2018, 2019)

Winners

See also
 List of United Arab Emirates horse races

References

Racing Post:

Open middle distance horse races
Horse races in the United Arab Emirates
Recurring events established in 1998
Nad Al Sheba Racecourse
1998 establishments in the United Arab Emirates